The sixth season of the Naruto: Shippuden anime series is directed by Hayato Date, and produced by Studio Pierrot and TV Tokyo. They are based on Part II for Masashi Kishimoto's manga series. The sixth season aired from June 2009 to January 2010 on TV Tokyo. The season follows Sasuke Uchiha taking revenge against Itachi to avenge their clan. It also features two arcs focusing on the background stories for Kakashi Hatake and Jiraiya. The season is referred to by its DVDs as the chapter of  released by Aniplex.

The seven DVD volumes were released in Japan between January 13, 2010 and July 7, 2011. Limited edition of Seventh DVD of "Master's Prophecy and Vengeance" comes with special DVD Behind the Scenes of Uchiha containing interview mixed with footage from episodes.

The season aired on Neon Alley from January 12 to February 4, 2013. The season would make its English television debut on Adult Swim's Toonami programming block and premiere from May 22, 2016 to January 29, 2017.

The season uses five musical themes: two opening themes and three ending themes.  by Ikimono-gakari is used as the opening theme from episode 113 to episode 128, continuing its usage from the previous season. It was replaced in episode 129 with "Sign" by Flow. "My Answer" by Seamo was used as the ending theme for episodes 116–128. It was replaced by "For You" by Azu in episode 142. The third feature film, Naruto Shippūden The Movie: Inheritors of the Will of Fire, based on the series, was released on August 1, 2009. The broadcast versions of episodes from 119 to 124 include scenes from the film in the opening themes, while still retaining the music "Hotaru no Hikari" by Ikimono-gakari.


Episode list

Home releases

Japanese

English

Notes

References
General
 

 

Specific

2009 Japanese television seasons
2010 Japanese television seasons
Shippuden Season 06